Robert Carr Wells Jr. (born April 10, 1968) is an American politician, perennial candidate and former college football coach. He was the head football coach at Savannah State University in Savannah, Georgia for the 2008 and 2009 seasons.

Wells unsuccessfully sought the Constitution Party's nomination for President of the United States in the 2012 presidential election. He ran as an independent in the 2016 presidential election. He was a candidate in the 2020 Democratic Party presidential primaries.

College football career
Wells played football at Furman University, playing fullback and wide receiver. He was a member of the 1988 NCAA Division I-AA national championship team.

Coaching career
Wells coached football from 1990 to 2009. He began his career as an assistant coach at Greer (S.C.) High School (1990–1995). He served as head coach at C.E. Murray High School Greeleyville, SC (1995–1997).

He moved to the University of South Carolina  as a graduate assistant for four seasons.  Wells worked with the defensive backs (1998-1999) and middle linebackers (2000). </ref>  Wells moved on to become the defensive coordinator at South Carolina State University in 2002. As the Bulldog's defensive coordinator (2002–2005) Wells' defense attained numerous national rankings and a Mid-Eastern Athletic Conference championship (2004).

In 2006, Wells was hired as the General Manager for the Augusta Spartans Arena Football Team where his duties included coaching, player personnel decisions, player development, team travel, fund raising and media relations.

Wells' final position before joining Savannah State was as the defensive coordinator and football marketing director for one season at Benedict College in Columbia, South Carolina.

Savannah State
In his first season as head coach, the team saw as many victories as the previous four seasons combined. Wells resigned his position on January 28, 2010 citing personal reasons. He subsequently filed a lawsuit against SSU for reverse discrimination, alleging that his resignation as head coach was forced. The lawsuit was settled in November 2011.

Head coaching record

Presidential bids

2012
On November 21, 2011, Wells announced his candidacy for President of the United States in the 2012 general election. He initially stated that he would run as an independent, saying "Our party system is broken. We need a third option". In December, he became a candidate for the presidential nomination of the Reform Party. In January 2012, Wells withdrew his bid for the Reform Party nomination and announced that he would instead seek the presidential nomination of the Constitution Party. At the Constitution Party National Convention, Wells received 58 of 402 votes (14.39%) for the party's presidential nomination, which was won on the first ballot by former U.S. Congressman Virgil Goode.

2016
Wells announced on November 3, 2012, that he would run for President of the United States again in 2016 as an independent candidate.  On July 17, 2013, he held a conference call to address a variety of accusations by his former campaign managers.

On September 24, 2013, Wells announced that he would discontinue campaigning as an independent candidate and would instead seek the presidential nomination of the Democratic Party. On March 9, 2016, a press release on Wells' website claimed that Wells is no longer running as a Democrat, but as an independent once again.

Wells never attempted to get his name on the ballot in any state.

2020
In 2018, Wells filed with the Federal Election Commission to run for President in the 2020 Democratic Party primary. He filed in person at the office of Secretary of State Bill Gardner to enter the New Hampshire Democratic primary on November 13, 2019. He then went on to get on the ballot in the Texas and Louisiana Democratic primaries.

Personal life
Wells holds both a master's degree in adult education from the University of South Carolina (2000) and a Bachelor's degree in health and physical education from Furman University (1990).

References

External links
 Official 2020 presidential campaign website
 Official 2016 presidential campaign website

1968 births
Living people
American athlete-politicians
North Carolina Constitutionalists
Furman Paladins football players
People from Jefferson County, Georgia
Players of American football from Georgia (U.S. state)
Savannah State Tigers football coaches
South Carolina Gamecocks football coaches
South Carolina State Bulldogs football coaches
Candidates in the 2012 United States presidential election
21st-century American politicians
Candidates in the 2016 United States presidential election
Candidates in the 2020 United States presidential election
University of South Carolina alumni
Georgia (U.S. state) Democrats
North Carolina Independents
Reform Party of the United States of America politicians
North Carolina Democrats